Motherly may refer to:

 an adjective to describe mothers
 Motherly bond, the relationship between a mother and her child
 Motherly (2009 film), a Belgian film
 Motherly (2021 film), a Canadian psychological thriller film